Brickellia cylindracea, the gravelbar brickellbush, is a North American species of flowering plants in the family Asteraceae. It is found only in central Texas.

Brickellia cylindracea is a perennial up to 120 cm (4 feet) tall, growing from a woody caudex. It produces many small flower heads with greenish, yellow, or yellow-orange disc florets but no ray florets.

References

External links
photo of herbarium specimen at Missouri Botanical Garden, type specimen of Brickellia cylindracea
Excerpts from Jim Conrad's Naturalist Newsletter

cylindracea
Flora of Texas
Plants described in 1847